Westpoint (also West Point) is an unincorporated community in Lawrence County, Tennessee, United States. Its ZIP code is 38486.

Demographics

Notes

Unincorporated communities in Lawrence County, Tennessee
Unincorporated communities in Tennessee